J. Helen Davidson, is an Indian politician who was elected from Kanyakumari constituency, out of 15 Lok Sabha as a Dravida Munnetra Kazhagam candidate in 2009 election. Helen Davidson was a teacher who had a bachelor's degree in Science and belongs to the Christian Nadar community. She was the first female Member of Parliament to represent Kanyakumary Loksabha Constituency. She married Davidson in 1993. Helen belongs to Dravida Munnetra Kazhagam and her family is responsible for the growth of DMK in Kanyakumari District.

Education
Helen Davidson schooled from Little Flower Girls Higher Secondary School, Nagercoil. She obtained her bachelor's degree from Holy Cross College, Nagercoil. Upon her graduation, she had a masters degree from Vivekananda College, Agastheeswaram and a Bachelor's degree in Education from Annamalai University.

References 

People from Kanyakumari district
Dravida Munnetra Kazhagam politicians
1971 births
Living people
Lok Sabha members from Tamil Nadu
India MPs 2009–2014
Women in Tamil Nadu politics
21st-century Indian women politicians
21st-century Indian politicians